John Rooke Corbett (27 September 1876 – 13 August 1949), better known as J. Rooke Corbett was one of the founder-members of The Rucksack Club and their Convener of Rambles. In the 1920s Corbett compiled a list of Scottish hills between 2500 and 3000 feet with a prominence of at least 500 feet. It was not published until after his death, when his sister passed it to the Scottish Mountaineering Club. It is now well known to Scottish hillwalkers as The Corbetts.

Early life 
Rooke Corbett attended both Hulme and Manchester Grammar Schools. While attending St John's College, Cambridge from 1895 to 1898, he walked from Manchester to Cambridge at the beginning of term, and back again at the end.

Climbing 
He was the fourth person to complete the Munros in 1930 and the first Englishman to do so. He was also the second to complete the "Tops".

Notes 

1876 births
1949 deaths
Alumni of St John's College, Cambridge
British rock climbers
People educated at Manchester Grammar School